Mousetail is used as a common name for species of plants in several genera:

Ivesia in the rose family
Myosurus in the buttercup family
Myosurus apetalus, bristly mousetail, native to western North and South America
Myosurus cupulatus, Arizona mousetail, native to the south-western United States and northern Mexico
Myosurus minimus, tiny mousetail,  native to much of the Northern Hemisphere
Myosurus sessilis, vernal pool mousetail, native to southern Oregon and central California in the United States
Rhipsalis baccifera, in particular R. baccifera subsp. horrida (syn. R. horrida), mouse tail or mouse tail cactus